This is the List of municipalities in Afyonkarahisar Province, Turkey .

References 

Geography of Afyonkarahisar Province
Afyonkarahisar